William Wodehouse (c. 1706 - 13 May 1737), of Kimberley, Norfolk, was a British Tory politician who sat in the House of Commons from 1734 to 1737.

Wodehouse was the eldest son of Sir John Wodehouse, 4th Baronet and his wife Mary Fermor, daughter of Sir William Fermor, 2nd Baronet. He was educated at Wymondham School, under Messrs Sayer and Brett and was admitted at Caius College, Cambridge on 12 June 1723. He married Frances Bathurst, daughter of Allen Bathurst, 1st Earl Bathurst on 5 August 1731.

At the 1734 British general election, Wodehouse was elected Member of Parliament for Norfolk in a close contest. He was also returned as MP for Cirencester on the interest of his father-in-law, but chose to sit for Norfolk.
  
Wodehouse died, in London on 13 May 1737 from smallpox and was buried at St James Westminster. He had no children, and the baronetcy was eventually inherited by his younger brother Armine, who succeeded him as MP for Norfolk.

References

1737 deaths
Members of Parliament for Norfolk
Deaths from smallpox
Alumni of Gonville and Caius College, Cambridge
British MPs 1727–1734
William
Heirs apparent who never acceded
1706 births
People from Kimberley, Norfolk